Borboropactus asper is a species of spiders of the genus Borboropactus. It is endemic to Sri Lanka.

See also
 List of Thomisidae species

References

External links
The first description of adult female of Borboropactus asper (O. P.-Cambridge, 1884) from Sri Lanka (Araneae: Thomisidae)

Spiders described in 1884
Thomisidae
Endemic fauna of Sri Lanka
Spiders of Asia